Hundt is a surname. Notable people with the surname include:

Gustav Hundt (1894–1945), German general in the Wehrmacht during World War II
Magnus Hundt (1449–1519), German physician and theologian
Neil Hundt, American bass guitarist
Reed Hundt (born 1948), American attorney

See also
Hund (disambiguation)

Surnames from nicknames